Yeniyurt is a village in the Polateli District, Kilis Province, Turkey. It had a population of 124 in 2022.

References

Villages in Polateli District